The Rio Grande do Sul blind snake (Epictia munoai) is a species of snake in the family Leptotyphlopidae . The species is endemic to southern South America.

Etymology
The specific name, munoai, is in honor of Uruguayan zoologist Juan Ignacio Muñoa (1925–1960).

Geographic range
E. munoai is found in northern Argentina, extreme southern Brazil, and Uruguay.

Reproduction
E. munoai is oviparous.

References

Further reading
Adalsteinsson SA, Branch WR, Trape S, Vitt LJ, Hedges SB (2009). "Molecular phylogeny, classification, and biogeography of snakes of the family Leptotyphlopidae (Reptilia, Squamata)". Zootaxa 2244: 1-50.
Freiberg M (1982). Snakes of South America. Hong Kong: T.F.H. Publications. 189 pp. . (Leptotyphlops munoai, p. 118).
Orejas-Miranda BR (1961). "Una nueva especie de ofidio de la familia Leptotyphlopidae ". Acta Biologica Venezuelica 3 (5): 83–97. (Leptotyphlops munoai, new species). (in Spanish).

Epictia
Reptiles described in 1961